Monochamus scabiosus is a species of beetle in the family Cerambycidae. It was described by Quedenfeldt in 1882, originally under the genus Monohammus.

References

scabiosus
Beetles described in 1882